The National Commissioners Invitational Tournament was an eight-team postseason men's college basketball tournament run by the National Collegiate Athletic Association (NCAA). It was introduced in 1974 as the Collegiate Commissioners Association Tournament.  Invitees were runner-up teams in major conferences. It was created because the NCAA wanted to "kill" the National Invitation Tournament (NIT), which, at that time, it did not control . It only lasted two years before being discontinued after changes to the NCAA tournament which allowed more than one team per conference to participate.

Summary 
The tournament was won in 1974 by Indiana over USC, 85–60, in St. Louis, Missouri. The 1974 tournament featured a collection of teams that came in second in their conferences due to NCAA Tournament rules at the time which only invited conference champions. 

In 1975, the NCAA tournament expanded to include at-large teams, from a total of 25 to 32 teams and began inviting more than one team from some conferences rather than solely conference champions. However, the 1975 tournament, renamed the National Commissioners Invitational Tournament, was still held and was won by Drake over Arizona, 83–76, in Louisville, Kentucky.

The Commissioners Invitational Tournament was discontinued after the 1975 tournament.

Championships

List of NCIT bids by school 
This is a list of NCIT bids by school.

The Big 8, Big 10, MAC, Missouri Valley, Pac-8, SEC and WAC sent teams to both tournaments.  The Southwest only was invited to the 1974 tournament while the Southern Conference was only invited to the 1975 tournament.

References

External links
 Article on Drake's NCIT Championship

College men's basketball competitions in the United States
Postseason college basketball competitions in the United States
Recurring sporting events established in 1974
Recurring events disestablished in 1975
NCIT bids by school